Syzygium phaeophyllum is a species of plant in the family Myrtaceae. It is endemic to Fiji.

References

Endemic flora of Fiji
phaeophyllum
Critically endangered plants
Taxonomy articles created by Polbot
Taxa named by Elmer Drew Merrill
Taxa named by Lily May Perry